George Dickey may refer to: 
George Dickey (baseball) (1915–1976), Major League Baseball player
George H. Dickey (1858–1923), American lawyer
George Scott Dickey (1884–1953), farmer and political figure in Nova Scotia, Canada
George E. Dickey (1840–1900), American architect

See also
George Dickie (disambiguation)